Charles George Noel, 2nd Earl of Gainsborough (5 September 1818 – 13 August 1881), styled Viscount Campden between 1841 and 1866, was a British peer and Whig politician.

Background
Gainsborough was the only child of Charles Noel, 1st Earl of Gainsborough, by his second wife Elizabeth, daughter of Sir George Grey, 1st Baronet. His mother died two weeks after he was born. He was the half-brother of Gerard Noel. He was educated privately and at Trinity College, Cambridge.

Career
Gainsborough succeeded his uncle William Noel as Member of Parliament for Rutland in 1840, but only held the seat until the following year. He then served a year as High Sheriff of Rutland for 1848. In 1866 he succeeded his father in the earldom and entered the House of Lords. The following year he was appointed Lord Lieutenant of Rutland, which he remained until his death. He was a lieutenant colonel in the Prince Albert's Own Leicestershire Yeomanry  from 1879–81, recorded as captain on 12 August 1850.

He and his wife embraced Roman Catholicism on New Year's Day in 1850.

Family
Lord Gainsborough married Ida Harriet Augusta, daughter of William Hay, 18th Earl of Erroll and Elizabeth FitzClarence, illegitimate daughter of King William IV, in 1841. The family home was at Flitteriss Park.

They had five children:
 Lady Blanche (25 March 1845 – 21 March 1881), who married Thomas Murphy
 The "Lady Blanche House" is commemorated by New Hampshire Historical Marker No. 109 in Bartlett, New Hampshire
 Lady Constance (19 October 1847 – 8 April 1891), who married Sir Henry Bellingham, 4th Baronet
 Charles, 3rd Earl of Gainsborough (20 October 1850 – 17 April 1926), had issue
 Edward (28 April 1852 – 9 November 1917), who married Ruth Lucas
 Lady Edith (1849 - 22 August 1890), who became a nun

Lady Gainsborough died in October 1867. Lord Gainsborough remained a widower until his death in August 1881, aged 62. He was succeeded in the earldom by his eldest son, Charles.

His grandsons included Edward Noel and John Baptist Lucius Noel.

References

External links
 

1818 births
1881 deaths
2
High Sheriffs of Rutland
Lord-Lieutenants of Rutland
Noel, Charles
Noel, Charles
UK MPs who inherited peerages
Noel, Charles
Alumni of Trinity College, Cambridge
Converts to Roman Catholicism from Anglicanism
Charles
Leicestershire Yeomanry officers